Leuconostoc miyukkimchii  is a Gram-positive, non-spore-forming, facultatively anaerobic and non-motile bacterium from the genus of Leuconostoc which has been isolated from the fermented algae Undaria pinnatifida from Korea.

References

 

Lactobacillaceae
Bacteria described in 2012